Dichomeris subdentata is a moth in the family Gelechiidae. It was described by Edward Meyrick in 1922. It is found in Pará, Brazil.

The forewings are leaden grey with a triangular blackish finely white-edged blotch from the dorsum before the middle, nearly reaching the costa. There is a round blackish finely white-edged spot in the disc touching the posterior fascia and also a broad blackish fascia from three-fourths of the costa to the tornus, edged anteriorly by a fine white hardly oblique line. There is also an irregular blackish marginal line around the apex and termen preceded by a white line. The hindwings are dark fuscous.

References

Moths described in 1922
subdentata